= Emily Burling Waite =

American artist (1887–1980)

- Born: 1887; Worcester, MA
- Died: 1980 (aged 92–93)

Emily Burling Waite (1887–1980) was an American printmaker and painter.

== Early life and education ==
Born in Worcester, Massachusetts, she studied first at the Worcester Art Museum School, then the Art Students League, New York. Following this, she studied for two years at the Boston Museum of Fine Arts School.

== Career ==
Waite held the Paige Travelling Scholarship of the Museum School from 1910-1912, and she had a solo exhibit in 1913 at the Renaissance Court. In 1917 in Newport, Rhode Island, Waite had a solo exhibit of portraits and etchings, which was reviewed as "the drawing of the former is excellent," and in 1921 she had a studio in Newport.

== Life ==
Waite married Arthur Williams Manchester, a shipwright and president of the Williams and Manchester Shipyard, on September 10, 1924 in Worcester. They had two children, Lemuel A. W. Manchester and Laura Manchester Smith.

== Collections ==
Her work is included in the collections of the Museum of Fine Arts, Boston; Smithsonian American Art Museum; and the Metropolitan Museum of Art.
